Ljubiša Simić (born 27 February 1963 in Smederevo, SR Serbia, then Yugoslavia) is a former boxer from Yugoslavia, who competed in two Summer Olympics for his native country: in 1984 and in 1988. In both occasions he had an early exit from the tournament. Simić became professional in 1993, and recorded thirteen wins (six knock-outs) and three losses.

Amateur Highlights 
1984 Summer Olympics represented Yugoslavia as a Bantamweight. His result was:
Lost to Pedro Nolasco (Dominican Republic) in the Round of 64 by decision, 0-5
1985 European Amateur Champion at Bantamweight
1988 Summer Olympics represented Yugoslavia as a Featherweight. His results were:
1st round bye
Lost to Mikhail Kazaryan (Soviet Union) 0-5

External links
 Profile on Boxing-Records
 

1963 births
Serbian male boxers
Olympic boxers of Yugoslavia
Boxers at the 1984 Summer Olympics
Boxers at the 1988 Summer Olympics
Living people
Sportspeople from Smederevo
Yugoslav male boxers
Mediterranean Games gold medalists for Yugoslavia
Competitors at the 1991 Mediterranean Games
Mediterranean Games medalists in boxing
Bantamweight boxers